Vice-Admiral Gregory Ralph Maddison CMM, MSC, CD (born 6 August 1949) is a retired officer of the Canadian Forces. He was Chief of the Maritime Staff from 24 September 1997 to 21 June 2001.

Career
Maddison joined the Canadian Forces in 1972.  He became Commanding Officer of the destroyer  in 1986, Director Maritime Operations Plans and Reserves in 1989 and Commander of the First Canadian Destroyer Squadron in 1991. He went on to be Commander of NATO's Standing Naval Force Atlantic in 1993, Assistant Chief of Staff (Personnel & Training) in 1994 and Chief of the Maritime Staff in September 1997. His last appointment was as Deputy Chief of the Defence Staff in May 2001 before retiring in 2005.

Awards and decorations
Maddison's personal awards and decorations include the following:

References

Living people
Royal Canadian Navy officers
Commanders of the Order of Military Merit (Canada)
Recipients of the Meritorious Service Decoration
Canadian admirals
1949 births
People from Truro, Nova Scotia
Commanders of the Royal Canadian Navy
Canadian military personnel from Nova Scotia